Pseuderesia mapongua is a butterfly in the family Lycaenidae. It is found in Gabon.

References

Butterflies described in 1893
Poritiinae
Butterflies of Africa